Victoria River was an electoral division of the Legislative Assembly in Australia's Northern Territory. One of the Legislative Assembly's original electorates, it was first contested at the 1974 election, and was named after the Victoria River. It was abolished in 2001 after a redistribution removed much of the Victoria River area from the seat, and was largely replaced with the new electorate of Daly.

Members for Victoria River

Election results

References 

Former electoral divisions of the Northern Territory